Haft Cheshmeh (also Romanized as Haft Chashmeh; also known as Gāv Cheshmeh, Gavtachashmeh, Gavtacheshma, Haft Cheshmeh, and Haft Cheshmehé Anzab) is a village in Guney-ye Gharbi Rural District, Tasuj District, Shabestar County, East Azerbaijan Province, Iran. At the 2006 census, its population was 450, in 126 families.

References 

Populated places in Shabestar County